Rafael Rivera Esbrí (2 July 1870 – 9 November 1965) was Mayor of Ponce, Puerto Rico from 1915 to 1917.

Early years
Rivera Esbri was the son of Ramón Rivera Alvarado and Julia Esbri. He married Faneta Bengoa y Larrauri and had a daughter named Lili Belen, born around 1904. His great-grandson is actor Benicio del Toro.

El Polvorín
Rivera Esbri is best remembered for an incident that has little to do with his work as mayor.  He is remembered as the only civilian who in the company of seven of Ponce's firefighters confronted and brought under control the fire of 25 January 1899 that took place at the American munitions depot in the city of Ponce, located where the Ponce High School is currently located. Rivera Esbri and the others did this in defiance of an order from the American military officials not to attempt to fight the fire. Their bravery is said to have saved the city from total destruction.

Obelisk
In 1906, the Legislature of Puerto Rico issued a proclamation to officially declare Rafael Rivera Esbri and the seven firefighters heroes.  In time, the city of Ponce also built an obelisk to their memory which is located at Plaza Las Delicias (See Monumento a los heroes de El Polvorín), and is dedicated to Rivera Esbri and the seven firefighters who risked their lives in the 25 January 1899 fire. Rivera Esbri's name, along with those of the firefighters are engraved on the obelisk.

Mayoral work
As mayor, Rivera Esbri founded, in 1916, the cemetery at Barrio Coto Laurel in Ponce. Rivera Esbri founded Partido Ponceño, which was short-lived, and around 1950 he ran for mayor of Ponce.

Death and burial
Upon his death, Rafael Rivera Esbri was buried at the mausoleum reserved for Ponce firefighters in the Monumento a los heroes de El Polvorín at Cementerio Civil de Ponce. He is the only civilian non-firefighter in the mausoleum. He died on 9 November 1965 at age 95.

Honors
In Ponce there is a street in Urbanización Las Delicias of Barrio Magueyes named after him.

See also

 Ponce, Puerto Rico
 List of Puerto Ricans
 List of mayors of Ponce, Puerto Rico
 25 de Enero Street

References

Further reading
 Fay Fowlie de Flores. Ponce, Perla del Sur: Una Bibliográfica Anotada. Second Edition. 1997. Ponce, Puerto Rico: Universidad de Puerto Rico en Ponce. p. 216. Item 1109. 
 Cayetano Coll y Toste. Boletín Histórico de Puerto Rico. San Juan, Puerto Rico: Cantera Fernandez. 1914–1927. (Colegio Universitario Tecnológico de Ponce, CUTPO).
 Fay Fowlie de Flores. Ponce, Perla del Sur: Una Bibliografía Anotada. Segunda Edición. 1997. Ponce, Puerto Rico: Universidad de Puerto Rico en Ponce. p. 174. Item 893. 
 Ramon E. Bauzá. Con la ventana abierta...era mejor cuando era peor. San Juan, Puerto Rico: Cordillera. 1996. (UPR-RP; CUTPO)

Mayors of Ponce, Puerto Rico
Burials at Cementerio Civil de Ponce
1870 births
1965 deaths